Gilbert Ning Ling (December 26, 1919 – November 10, 2019) was a Chinese-born American cell physiologist, biochemist and scientific investigator.

In 1944, Ling won the biology slot of the sixth Boxer Indemnity Scholarship, a nationwide competitive examination that allowed Chinese science and engineering students full scholarship to study in a United States university. In 1947 he co-developed the Gerard-Graham-Ling microelectrode, a device that allows scientists to more accurately measure the electrical potentials of living cells. In 1962 he proposed the Association induction hypothesis, which claims to be unifying, general theory of the living cell, and is an alternative and controversial hypothesis to the membrane and steady-state membrane pump theories, and three years later added the Polarized-Oriented Multilayer (PM or POM) theory of cell water.

Ling carried out scientific experiments that attempted to disprove the accepted view of the cell as a membrane containing a number of pumps such as the sodium potassium pump and the calcium pump and channels that engage in active transport.

He died in November 2019, one month short of turning 100.

Early life and education 

Ling was born in December 1919, in Nanking, China. He grew up in Beijing and entered the National Central University (Nanking University) in Chungking as a student of animal husbandry. After two years, he transferred to the biology department and received a Biology B.Sc. degree, minoring in physics and chemistry in 1943.

In 1944, having done graduate work in Biochemistry at the National Southwestern Associated University (National Tsing Hua University) in Kunming, Ling won the sixth Boxer Indemnity Scholarship. In early 1946 he began his graduate study in the Department of Physiology at the University of Chicago under Professor Ralph W. Gerard. In 1948 he completed his Ph.D on the effects of metabolism, temperature and other factors on the membrane potential of single frog muscle fibers which was published in Dec 1949 in a series of 4 papers in the Journal of Cellular and Comparative Physiology, Volume 34, Issue 3. He spent two more years under Prof. Gerard as a Seymour Coman Postdoctoral Fellow.

Academic career 

In 1944, Ling won the only Biology slot of the sixth nationwide Boxer Indemnity Fellowship, to study physiology in the United States, which he took up in January 1946.

From 1950 to 1953 Ling worked as an instructor at the Medical School of the Johns Hopkins University in Baltimore. His research and experiments led him to the conclusion that the mainstream membrane pump theory of the living cell was not correct. This early embryonic version of the Association induction hypothesis was called Ling's Fixed Charge Hypothesis (LFCH).

From 1953 to 1957 he continued full-time research at the Neuropsychiatric institute at the University of Illinois Medical School in Chicago. Beginning as an Assistant Professor, he was promoted two years later to (tenured) Associate Professor-ship.

In 1957, he accepted the position of Senior Research Scientist at the Basic Research Department of the newly founded Eastern Pennsylvania Psychiatric Institute.

In 1962 his first book entitled "A Physical Theory of the Living State: the Association-Induction Hypothesis." was published. At this time Ling became director of a research laboratory at the Pennsylvania Hospital in Philadelphia.

In 1984, Ling published his second book "In Search of the Physical Basis of Life,".

In October 1988, Ling's laboratory shut down due to his inability to obtain research funds from National Institutes of Health and other funding agencies. Raymond Vahan Damadian offered to support him and two of his staff: Margaret Ochsenfeld and Dr. Zhen-dong Chen.

From 1982 to 1985 he was a co-Editor-in-chief of the Physiological Chemistry & Physics and Medical NMR journal and since 1986, has been its sole Editor-in-Chief.
In 1992 Ling published his third book, "A Revolution in the Physiology of the Living Cell."
In 2001 his fourth book "Life at the Cell and Below-Cell Level"  was published and has been translated to Russian and Chinese.

In 2011 his wife of 60 years, Shirley Wang Ling, died from incurable pancreatic cancer.
In 2014 at the age of 94 he published his fifth book, a reply to Erwin Schrödinger's 1944 book What is Life? called What is Life Answered.
He has published over 200 scientific papers, although much of his later work has been largely ignored by the scientific community.

Gerard-Graham-Ling microelectrode 

Also known as the Ling-Gerard microelectrode and after the 1940s further developed into the glass capillary microelectrode has played a vital role in modern neurophysiology and medicine. 

John Eccles applied the microelectrode to studies of activity of individual units within the spinal cord and brain and Andrew Huxley used it in muscle cells.

In 1963, Hodgkin with Huxley, won the Nobel Prize in Physiology or Medicine for their work on the basis of nerve "action potentials," the electrical impulses which enable the activity of an organism to be coordinated by a central nervous system. Hodgkin and Huxley shared the prize that year with John Eccles, who was cited for his research on synapses.
Worldwide use of this new microelectrode spread rapidly after this  and has subsequently proven to be one of the most important devices applied to the study of cellular physiology.
The microelectrode in use today is essentially the same as this, except that it usually contains a concentrated salt solution, and is commonly referred to as the glass capillary.
In 1950 Gerard was nominated for the Nobel Prize for helping to develop the microelectrode as used in electrophysiology.

Association induction hypothesis 

An alternative and controversial hypothesis to the membrane and membrane pump theories, the Association Induction Hypothesis is a claim related to the properties and activities of microscopic assemblies of molecules, atoms, ions and electrons of the smallest unit of life called nano-protoplasm.

Ling wrote books describing his hypothesis in 1962 and 1984; and later self-published other books.

Polarized-oriented multilayer theory 

In 1965, Ling added his Polarized-Oriented Multilayer (PM or POM) theory of cell water to the Association Induction Hypothesis. The theory argues that cell water is polarized and oriented and thus dynamically structured.

More recent studies by Gerald Pollack (2001, 2013) and Mae-Wan Ho (2008, 2012) have confirmed the structured nature of cell water and 
some scientists such as Vladimir Matveev (2012) continue to explore the ideas that Ling introduced in the 1960s.

Criticism 

In 1974, Lawrence G. Palmer and Jagdish Gulati tested one aspect of Ling's theories, namely whether potassium ions within the cell are bound or free. Contrary to Ling's prediction, they found that in fact potassium ions within frog skeletal muscle cells are free.

See also 

Membrane potential
Sodium-potassium pump
Cell membrane
History of cell membrane theory

References

Publications 

 Gilbert N. Ling. A Physical Theory of the Living State: the Association-Induction Hypothesis. Blaisdell Publishing Company, A Division of Random House, Inc., London. 1962. 682 pages. Library of Congress Catalogue Number: 62-11835
 Gilbert N. Ling. In Search of the Physical Basis of Life. Plenum Press, New York and London. 1984. 791 pages. 
 Gilbert N. Ling. A Revolution in the Physiology of the Living Cell. Krieger Publishing Company, Malabar, Florida. 1992. 378 pages. 
 Gilbert N. Ling. Life at the Cell and Below-Cell Level: The Hidden History of a Fundamental. Revolution in Biology. New York: Pacific Press. 2001. 373 pages. 
 Gilbert N. Ling. What is Life Answered. Cushing Malloy Inc., Ann Arbor, Michigan. 2013. 120 pages.

External links 
 Dr. Gilbert Ling's website

1919 births
2019 deaths
Boxer Indemnity Scholarship recipients
Chinese emigrants to the United States
University of Chicago alumni
National Central University alumni
Nanjing University alumni
Academic staff of Tsinghua University
University of Chicago faculty
Johns Hopkins University faculty
University of Illinois faculty